The Maya are an extinct ethnic group native to the old Wej province in Ethiopia. They were renowned for their skilled archers, the services of which were available as mercenaries. The Maya were primarily pastoralists and their livelihood was with their cattle.

Futuh al-Habash
Maya archers initially formed the core of the southern armies of Abyssinian Emperor Lebna Dengel in resisting the Conquest of Abyssinia (Futuh al-Habash) by the forces of Ahmad ibn Ibrahim al-Ghazi (Gurey or Gran), Imam of the Adal Sultanate. However, after the fall of their homeland to Ahmed Gurey's armies, in true mercenary fashion, the Maya bowmen switched sides.

Maya bowmen were armed with spears. They  tipped their arrows with ouabain, a poison which caused death by cardiac arrest or respiratory failure.

Oromo migrations
The Maya homeland of Wej was one of the first lands to be invaded by the Oromo migrations. The Maya repelled the weight of the Oromo for years due to their skill with the bow, until the Oromo armies changed tactics and used thick oxhide shields and fixed shield formations. After Wej was conquered by the Oromos, the Maya were either assimilated or exterminated by the invading Oromos.

Notable people
Malik Ambar (1548 – 1626) was born as a Maya under the birth name Chapu. As a child he was sold into slavery by his parents and was brought to India as a slave. There he became a Siddi military leader of great renown in the Deccan region and later a capable administrator.

References

Ethnic groups in Ethiopia
Extinct ethnic groups